Juprelle is a municipality of Wallonia located in the province of Liège, Belgium. 

On 1 January 2006 Juprelle had a total resident population of 8,405. The total area is 35.36 km² which gives a population density of 238 inhabitants per km².

The municipality consists of the following districts: Fexhe-Slins, Juprelle, Lantin, Paifve, Slins, Villers-Saint-Siméon, Voroux-lez-Liers, and Wihogne.

See also
 List of protected heritage sites in Juprelle

References

External links
 

Municipalities of Liège Province